Sheikh Hasina Medical College is a government medical college in Habiganj, Bangladesh, founded in 2017 and affiliated with Shahjalal University of Science and Technology. The college's first batch of students began their first term on January 10, 2018, on its temporary campus of Habiganj Sadar Hospital.
Sheikh Hasina Medical College is a medical college located in Habiganj district of Sylhet division of Bangladesh. [1] On 10 January 2018, the medical college started its educational activities with 51 students.
The college is located in the heart of Habiganj district town. Sunamganj and Sylhet in the north, Moulvibazar in the east, Kishoreganj and Brahmanbaria districts in the west.

History:

Prime Minister Sheikh Hasina announced the establishment of a medical college in Habiganj on November 29, 2014, at a public meeting at Habiganj New Ground.  Administrative approval was given for the admission of 50 students on 12 January 2015. [3] In September 2016, Md.  Abu Sufyan was appointed. [3] But no student was approved for admission as there was no place to take classes.  51 students in 2016–17 academic year;  The educational activities of the college started with 17 male and 33 female students. [2]

References

Medical colleges in Bangladesh
Habiganj District
2018 establishments in Bangladesh
Educational institutions established in 2018
Education in Sylhet